One Out Of The Bag is a DVD/CD live release by New Zealand Rock music band Split Enz. It was recorded during their 2006 tour of Australia. This is also the first Split Enz release since Waiata/Corroboree to feature drummer Malcolm Green, who was sacked shortly before Waiata/Corroboree's release. Green shares drum duties with percussionist Noel Crombie.

Track listing 
(Songs written by Tim Finn unless noted)
DVD
Shark Attack
Poor Boy 
One Step Ahead (Neil Finn) 
Nobody Takes Me Seriously 
Double Happy (Eddie Rayner) 
Message to My Girl (Neil Finn) 
Dirty Creature (Tim Finn, Neil Finn, Nigel Griggs) 
Stuff And Nonsense 
Matinee Idyll(129) (Tim Finn, Phil Judd) 
Strait Old Line (Neil Finn) 
Pioneer (Eddie Rayner) 
Six Months In A Leaky Boat (Tim Finn, Split Enz) 
I Got You (Neil Finn) 
What's The Matter With You (Neil Finn) 
I See Red 
First Encore
I Hope I Never 
Bold As Brass (Tim Finn, Robert Gillies)
My Mistake (Tim Finn, Eddie Rayner)
Second Encore
Take A Walk (Neil Finn)
Charlie
History Never Repeats (Neil Finn)

CD 
"Shark Attack" – 3:34
"Poor Boy" – 3:46
"One Step Ahead" – 2:53
"Give It a Whirl" (Neil Finn, Tim Finn) – 3:06
"Nobody Takes Me Seriously" – 3:37
"Double Happy" – 4:26
"Message to My Girl" – 6:10
"Dirty Creature" – 5:35
"Stuff and Nonsense" – 4:30
"Strait Old Line" – 4:42
"Pioneer" – 2:03
"Six Months in a Leaky Boat" – 4:37
"I Got You" – 3:49
"What's the Matter with You" – 3:33
"I See Red" – 4:37
"I Hope I Never" – 4:55
"Take a Walk" – 3:38
"History Never Repeats" – 3:56

Musicians 
Tim Finn - lead vocals, piano, acoustic guitar     
Neil Finn - lead vocals, electric guitar, acoustic guitar, piano, mandolin     
Eddie Rayner - keyboards, piano, backing vocals     
Nigel Griggs - bass guitar, backing vocals     
Noel Crombie - percussion, drums on "Message To My Girl", "Dirty Creature:, "Strait Old Line", "Six Months in a Leaky Boat" and "Take a Walk", backing vocals, guitar freak out on "My Mistake"    
Malcolm Green - drums (percussion only on "Message to My Girl", "Dirty Creature:, "Strait Old Line", "Six Months in a Leaky Boat" and "Take a Walk"), backing vocals

Certifications

References

2007 live albums
2007 video albums
Live video albums
Split Enz live albums
Split Enz video albums